Emeric Zápolya, also Emeric Szapolyai (died September 1487), was the Ban of Croatia, Dalmatia and Slavonia between 1464 and 1465 and Palatine of the Kingdom of Hungary between 1486 and 1487.

Notes

Sources

|-

|-
|-

1487 deaths
Emeric
Palatines of Hungary
Year of birth unknown
Royal treasurers (Kingdom of Hungary)